

174001–174100 

|-bgcolor=#f2f2f2
| colspan=4 align=center | 
|}

174101–174200 

|-bgcolor=#f2f2f2
| colspan=4 align=center | 
|}

174201–174300 

|-id=281
| 174281 Lonský ||  || Vladimír Lonský (born 1953), a heart surgeon, works in the Faculty Hospital in Olomouc, Czech Republic || 
|}

174301–174400 

|-id=361
| 174361 Rickwhite ||  || Richard L. White (born 1953), American astronomer with the Sloan Digital Sky Survey || 
|-id=362
| 174362 Bethwillman ||  || Beth Willman (born 1976), American astronomer with the Sloan Digital Sky Survey || 
|-id=363
| 174363 Donyork ||  || Don York (born 1944), American astronomer with the Sloan Digital Sky Survey || 
|-id=364
| 174364 Zakamska ||  || Nadia Zakamska (born 1979), Russian-American astrophysicist with the Sloan Digital Sky Survey || 
|-id=365
| 174365 Zibetti ||  || Stefano Zibetti (born 1976), Italian astronomer and a contributor to the Sloan Digital Sky Survey || 
|}

174401–174500 

|-id=466
| 174466 Zucker ||  || Daniel Zucker (born 1968), American astronomer with the Sloan Digital Sky Survey || 
|}

174501–174600 

|-id=515
| 174515 Pamelaivezic ||  || Pamela Ivezic (born 1961), an American singer, musicologist, music educator, a patron of astronomy || 
|-id=567
| 174567 Varda ||  || Varda the star-kindler, is the queen of the stars in Tolkien's legendarium || 
|}

174601–174700 

|-bgcolor=#f2f2f2
| colspan=4 align=center | 
|}

174701–174800 

|-bgcolor=#f2f2f2
| colspan=4 align=center | 
|}

174801–174900 

|-
| 174801 Etscorn ||  || Frank T. Etscorn (born 1945), American professor of psychology at New Mexico Institute of Mining and Technology, inventor of the nicotine patch and amateur astronomer, founder of the university's Frank T. Etscorn Campus Observatory || 
|}

174901–175000 

|-bgcolor=#f2f2f2
| colspan=4 align=center | 
|}

References 

174001-175000